Yuantou may refer to:

 Yuantou, Pingle County (源头镇), town in Guangxi, China
 Yuantou, Zanhuang County (院头镇), town in Hebei, China